Logan Township is an inactive township in Wayne County, in the U.S. state of Missouri.

Logan Township has the name of the local Logan family.

References

Townships in Missouri
Townships in Wayne County, Missouri